Danylo Anatoliyovych Volynets (born 4 May 2002) is a Ukrainian professional footballer who plays as a central midfielder for Polissya Zhytomyr.

References

External links
 
 

2002 births
Living people
Footballers from Zhytomyr
Ukrainian footballers
Ukraine youth international footballers
Association football midfielders
FC Dnipro players
SC Dnipro-1 players
FC Podillya Khmelnytskyi players
FC Polissya Zhytomyr players
Ukrainian Second League players
Sportspeople from Zhytomyr Oblast